An Access and Benefit Sharing Agreement (ABSA) is an agreement that defines the fair and equitable sharing of benefits arising from the use of genetic resources. ABSAs typically arise in relation to bioprospecting where indigenous knowledge is used to focus screening efforts for commercially valuable genetic and biochemical resources.  ABSAs recognise that bioprospecting frequently relies on indigenous or traditional knowledge, and that people or communities who hold such knowledge are entitled to a share of benefits arising from its commercial utilization.

History and development 
The concept of ABSAs stems from the Convention on Biological Diversity which, among other objectives, seeks to ensure the fair and equitable sharing of benefits arising from genetic resources. However, the highly controversial principle of Access and Benefit Sharing of the CDB stirred up a virulent debate which left most stakeholders unsatisfied with the framework provided. 

The Nagoya Protocol, a supplementary agreement to the Convention on Biological Diversity, provides a legal framework for implementing that objective. Article 5 of the Nagoya Protocol requires that benefits arising from the utilization of genetic resources, as well as from subsequent applications and commercialization, to be shared in a fair and equitable way with the party providing such resources. Article 5 states that such sharing shall be upon mutually agreed terms. An ABSA can be used to specify the terms on which the benefits will be shared in a particular case.

References

Agreements
Convention on Biological Diversity